The British-Australasian Tobacco Company Limited was an Australian tobacco manufacturer with offices in Sydney and Melbourne.

The company was formed by a merger of the Dixson Tobacco Company Limited and William Cameron Brothers and Company Proprietary. Sir William Dixson was company director from 1903-1908.

In popular culture
The tobacco tins constructed from tin plated thin rolled steel produced by the British-Australasian Tobacco Company are now collectable items.

References

1914 establishments in Australia
Manufacturing companies established in 1914
Defunct manufacturing companies of Australia
Tobacco companies of Australia